Craig Parry (born 11 June 1983) is an Australian Rules footballer who currently plays for the Woodville-West Torrens Football Club in the South Australian National Football League (SANFL). Parry won the SANFL Premiership with the club in 2011.

Career
Parry, a 6'4" (194 cm) tall Ruckman, was recruited from Western Australia by the Port Adelaide Magpies and made his SANFL debut with the famous club in 2003. He would play in 34 games for the Magpies before signing to play with the South Adelaide Panthers. After playing another 80 SANFL games while with Souths, Parry once again moved on and was signed by the WWT Eagles for the 2010 SANFL season.

It was with at the Eagles that Parry's career started to blossom. Already regarded as one of the better big men in the SANFL, he would be a member of the Eagles team which surprised reigning premiers Central District in the 2011 SANFL Grand Final at AAMI Stadium, the Eagles winning their third premiership with a 12.9 (81) to 11.12 (78) in front of 25,234 fans. Parry was judged the best player on the ground and was awarded the Jack Oatey Medal for his efforts.

Following the Grand Final win, Parry shelved retirement plans and committed to a further season with the Eagles. He committed to play his 4th season with the club when he also re-signed for the 2013 season.

His good form continued in 2012, despite the Eagles slow start to the season, and he was rewarded be selection for South Australia for their Interstate Game against Western Australia. After helping the Croweaters to a 15.11 (101) to 13.9 (87) win, he was again selected for SA in 2013 and was the dominant ruckman on the ground in SA's 21.14 (140) to 9.4 (58) over the NEAFL North team.

References

External links

Woodville-West Torrens 2013 Players

1983 births
Living people
Port Adelaide Magpies players
South Adelaide Football Club players
Woodville-West Torrens Football Club players
Subiaco Football Club players
Australian rules footballers from Western Australia